Central Maternity Hospital was a Bronx hospital which opened 1938 and closed 1958. It was operated by Dr. Morris Leff, who initially called his facility '.

ControversyDr. Morris Leff Maternity Hospital was the first name used, "in the days when doctors ran their own hospitals." Although Leff "was carted off to jail for carrying out abortions" his notoriety also included baby-selling, sourcing the babies from unwed mothers. The New York Times'' headlined "Dr. Leff Pleads Not Guilty."

References

External links
 "Dr. Leff moved his maternity clinic from Manhattan to the Bronx" (Groups.JewishGen.org)
 Case of False Birth Records: Trial of Dr. Morris Leff

  

Defunct hospitals in the Bronx
History of the Bronx
Maternity hospitals in the United States
History of women in New York City